John Persson (born May 18, 1992) is a Swedish former professional ice hockey player. He played in the National Hockey League (NHL) with the New York Islanders after he was selected by the Islanders in the 5th round (125th overall) of the 2011 NHL Entry Draft.

Playing career
Persson played three seasons (2009–2012) of major junior hockey with the Red Deer Rebels of the Western Hockey League (WHL), scoring 63 goals and 67 assists for 130 points, while earning 102 penalty minutes, in 200 games played.

On May 29, 2012, the New York Islanders of the National Hockey League (NHL) signed Persson to a three-year entry-level contract.

During the 2013–14 season, Persson was recalled by the Islanders of the Sound Tigers and scored his first NHL goal on April 5, 2014 against Braden Holtby of the Washington Capitals.

On May 6, 2015, Persson opted to end his North American tenure within the Islanders organization and signed a two-year contract with Färjestad BK, re-uniting him with his brother Johan, of the SHL.

Following parts of two seasons with Brynäs IF, Persson announced his retirement from his ten year professional hockey career.

Career statistics

References

External links

1992 births
Living people
Bridgeport Sound Tigers players
Brynäs IF players
Färjestad BK players
Mora IK players
New York Islanders players
New York Islanders draft picks
Red Deer Rebels players
SaiPa players
Swedish ice hockey left wingers
People from Östersund
Sportspeople from Jämtland County